The Packard Caribbean is a full-sized luxury car that was made by the Packard Motor Car Company of Detroit, Michigan, during model years 1953 through 1956. Some of the Caribbean's styling was derived from the Pan American Packard show car of the previous year. Available only as a convertible from 1953 until 1955 with a hardtop model added in its final year of 1956.

Development
The domestic "Big Three" automakers were developing "quasi-custom" models. Marketers at the time described them as a "sports car, which usually meant anything with a convertible top, lots of performance, a few unique styling touches, and top-of-the-line price tag.

The image of Packard automobiles during the early 1950s was "perceived as stodgy and old-fashioned." Packard needed a "halo car to cast a modern glow on the marque." The company prepared a concept car, the Packard Pan-American, earning positive reception at auto shows during 1952. The Caribbean was introduced for the 1953 model year as "Packard's sportiest car ... based on the standard Cavalier convertible, with custom touches transforming it into a line-topping stunner."

1953

The 1953 Caribbean was perhaps Packard's most easily identified car because of its full cutout rear wheel housing and side trim, limited to a chrome band outline that stretched the car's entire length. The band also helped to further delineate the car's wheel openings. A steel continental spare tire was also standard. The hood featured a broad, low leaded-in hood scoop. Bodies for the Caribbean were modified by Mitchell-Bentley Corporation of Ionia, Michigan. Available "advertised" colors for the car were limited to Polaris Blue, Gulf Green Metallic, Maroon Metallic or Sahara Sand. However, a mere handful of special-ordered cars were built in Ivory or Black.

Interiors of the Caribbean were richly upholstered in leather. Most Caribbeans were also generously optioned, although the Ultramatic transmission was optional on the first year model at US$199 ($ in  dollars ). A list of optional equipment on other Packard vehicles was standard on the Caribbean that included heater and windshield defroster, power windows, power-adjustable front seat, power steering, and "Easamatic" power brakes. Only the signal-seeking radio with antenna and Solex tinted glass were extra-cost items. 

A total of 750 Caribbeans were built for the first model year, and these cars are highly sought after as collectible cars in the current collectible automobile market. Restored cars regularly sell in the six-figure ranges. The listed retail price for the Caribbean Convertible was US$5,210 ($ in  dollars ).

1954

Beginning in 1954 the Caribbean was elevated to senior Packard status. The Caribbean continued to have its own unique styling features, however, the full rear-wheel cut-outs were eliminated and the use of chrome/stainless trim became more liberal, and allowed for two-tone paint combinations. A four-way power seat was available.

Like the Patrician, the Caribbean also gained heavier "finned" headlight housings, one of the visual cues applied to help differentiate the senior Packards from the lower-priced models. The  straight-eight senior engine was used in this final incarnation of Packard's straight eight engine. A total of 400 Caribbeans were produced for the model year, making 1954 the rarest year for the Caribbean. The listed retail price increased to US$6,100 ($ in  dollars )

1955

Model year 1955 saw the Caribbean line, now with an all-new Packard developed V8 engine,  fully adopt the Senior Packard line styling; the car was also available in two or three-tone paint patterns. Designer Richard Teague succeeded in restyling the old Packard Senior body into a modern-looking design. The single hood scoop was split into two units, and the car also received Packard's Torsion-Level Torsion bar suspension at all four wheels.  Production for 1955 increased substantially at 9,127 units with a listed retail price of $US5,932 ($ in  dollars ).

1956

For the 1956 model year, the Caribbean was designated as a separate luxury series and added a hardtop model. Trim differences between the 1955 and 1956 cars were slight. Grille textures changed to match those ones used on concurrent Patricians, and the rear treatment, featuring Packard's cathedral-style taillights was continued. The headlights also received slightly more exaggerated brows. Unique new interiors featured reversible seat cushions with cloth on one side and leather on the other. Total model year production equaled 263 hardtops and 276 convertibles with the convertible listed at US$5,995 ($ in  dollars ). 

The model was discontinued when Packard production ended in Detroit.

See also
 GAZ-13, Soviet Chaika

References

Sources
George, Vance- The Packard Club 53-54 Caribbean Roster Keeper

Caribbean
Cars introduced in 1953
Rear-wheel-drive vehicles
Personal luxury cars